The International Convention for the Suppression of Counterfeiting Currency is a 1929 League of Nations treaty whereby states agree to criminalize acts of currency counterfeiting. It remains the principal international agreement on currency counterfeiting.

Background
The post-war years were marked by a meteoric rise of money counterfeiting across Europe. Hyperinflation plagued many European currencies significantly increasing the profitability of forging the relatively stable United States dollar and Dutch guilder. At the same time political tensions hindered international police collaboration on the issue. Vienna became a hub of the clandestine trade. Its long established trade connections, the use of easily forgeable overprinted banknotes by the successor states of Austria-Hungary and breakdown of police collaboration between said states led to the creation of large criminal syndicates dedicated to counterfeiting. In Hungary, nationalist groups began forging the currencies of neighboring countries with the tacit support of the Hungarian state. In 1921, a group of Hungarians led by Turkologist Gyula Mészáros set up a press in the town of Metzelsdorf outside Graz, Austria. The group managed to produce and put into circulation 60,000 500-Czechoslovak koruna banknotes. Most of the forgers were arrested in July 1921, by that time the Czechoslovak government was forced to pull the entire sokol note series out of circulation, undermining the credibility of its currency reforms.

It was estimated that approximately 1 million $ worth of counterfeit currency was put into circulation each year in the middle of the 1920s. The sokol affair prompted Czechoslovak police to establish police unit specializing in countering money counterfeiting in Prague while also seeking cooperation with neighboring countries. In the Netherlands, K.H. Broekhoff founded the Dutch Counterfeit Money Center. Police authorities began closely collaborating with the issuing banks while criminal investigations of forgeries from different parts of the country were treated as a single case. In 1923, Vienna Chief of Police Johannes Schober convened the International Police Congress in Vienna which gave birth to the International Criminal Police Commission (ICPC). The ICPC promoted the internationalization of policing collating and disseminating information on crime between its members.

Another Hungarian nationalist counterfeiting plot known as the Franc affair was uncovered in December 1925. The plotters sought to intentionally damage the French economy through the large scale production of counterfeit French francs. In the aftermath of the affair France turned its attention to combating international counterfeiting. French lawmakers revised a February 1926 Czechoslovak proposal to create an international police organization whose members would fight money counterfeiting. French Prime Minister Aristide Briand's proposal called for the unification anti-counterfeiting laws, police and judicial cooperation and the creation of national anti-counterfeiting centers in each signatory. The proposal was heralded by Romanian legal expert Vespasian Pella who shaped it into the draft of the International Convention for the Suppression of Counterfeiting Currency.

Convention
States that ratify the Convention agree to criminalize the creation, use, and exportation or importation of counterfeit currency. Under the agreement, no distinction is to be made as to what currency is the subject of the crime. Under the treaty, currency counterfeiting is an extraditable offense. States also agree to establish a central office that will forward to all other state parties cancelled specimens of their state's currency and notify the other states when changes to their currency are implemented.

The Convention was concluded in Geneva on 20 April 1929 and entered into force on 22 February 1931.

Aftermath
The convention facilitated ICPC's recognition by the League of Nations and formalized its efforts to fight international crime. 

As of March 2016, it has 83 state parties and remains the primary international agreement on currency counterfeiting. It was most recently ratified by Serbia in March 2016. China, India, Japan, and the United States are among the states that have signed the treaty but have not ratified it.

Footnotes

References

External links
Text, League of Nations Treaty Series, vol. 112
Ratifications, un.org

International Convention for the Suppression of Counterfeiting Currency
Anti-counterfeiting treaties
International Convention for the Suppression of Counterfeiting Currency
International criminal law treaties
League of Nations treaties
International Convention for the Suppression of Counterfeiting Currency
Treaties concluded in 1929
Treaties entered into force in 1931
Currency treaties
Treaties of Algeria
Treaties of Andorra
Treaties of Australia
Treaties of the First Austrian Republic
Treaties of the Bahamas
Treaties of Belarus
Treaties of Belgium
Treaties of the Republic of Dahomey
Treaties of Bosnia and Herzegovina
Treaties of Vargas-era Brazil
Treaties of the Kingdom of Bulgaria
Treaties of Burkina Faso
Treaties of Colombia
Treaties of Ivory Coast
Treaties of Croatia
Treaties of Cuba
Treaties of Cyprus
Treaties of the Czech Republic
Treaties of Czechoslovakia
Treaties of Denmark
Treaties of Ecuador
Treaties of the Republic of Egypt (1953–1958)
Treaties of Estonia
Treaties of Fiji
Treaties of Finland
Treaties of the French Fourth Republic
Treaties of Gabon
Treaties of Georgia (country)
Treaties of Nazi Germany
Treaties of East Germany
Treaties of the Second Hellenic Republic
Treaties of Ghana
Treaties of the Holy See
Treaties of the Kingdom of Hungary (1920–1946)
Treaties of Indonesia
Treaties of the Iraqi Republic (1958–1968)
Treaties of the Irish Free State
Treaties of Israel
Treaties of the Kingdom of Italy (1861–1946)
Treaties of Kazakhstan
Treaties of Kenya
Treaties of Kuwait
Treaties of Latvia
Treaties of Lebanon
Treaties of Liberia
Treaties of Lithuania
Treaties of Luxembourg
Treaties of North Macedonia
Treaties of Malawi
Treaties of Malaysia
Treaties of Mali
Treaties of Malta
Treaties of Mauritius
Treaties of Mexico
Treaties of Monaco
Treaties of Montenegro
Treaties of Morocco
Treaties of the Netherlands
Treaties of Niger
Treaties of Norway
Treaties of Peru
Treaties of the Philippines
Treaties of the Second Polish Republic
Treaties of the Ditadura Nacional
Treaties of the Kingdom of Romania
Treaties of the Soviet Union
Treaties of San Marino
Treaties of Senegal
Treaties of Serbia
Treaties of Singapore
Treaties of Slovakia
Treaties of Slovenia
Treaties of the Solomon Islands
Treaties of South Africa
Treaties of Spain under the Restoration
Treaties of the Dominion of Ceylon
Treaties of Sweden
Treaties of Switzerland
Treaties of Syria
Treaties of Thailand
Treaties of Togo
Treaties of Turkey
Treaties of Uganda
Treaties of the United Kingdom
Treaties of the Kingdom of Yugoslavia
Treaties of Zimbabwe
Treaties of South Vietnam
Treaties extended to the Faroe Islands
Treaties extended to Greenland
Treaties extended to the Netherlands Antilles
Treaties extended to Surinam (Dutch colony)
Treaties extended to Aruba
Treaties extended to Guernsey
Treaties extended to Jersey
Treaties extended to the Isle of Man
Treaties extended to the West Indies Federation
Treaties extended to the Colony of the Bahamas
Treaties extended to Basutoland
Treaties extended to the Bechuanaland Protectorate
Treaties extended to Bermuda
Treaties extended to British Guiana
Treaties extended to British Honduras
Treaties extended to the British Solomon Islands
Treaties extended to the Falkland Islands
Treaties extended to the Federation of Rhodesia and Nyasaland
Treaties extended to the Colony of Fiji
Treaties extended to the Gambia Colony and Protectorate
Treaties extended to Gibraltar
Treaties extended to the Gilbert and Ellice Islands
Treaties extended to British Kenya
Treaties extended to British Mauritius
Treaties extended to the Colony of North Borneo
Treaties extended to the Colony of Sarawak
Treaties extended to the Colony of Sierra Leone
Treaties extended to the Crown Colony of Singapore
Treaties extended to Swaziland (protectorate)
Treaties extended to Tanganyika (territory)
Treaties extended to the Uganda Protectorate
Treaties extended to the Sultanate of Zanzibar
Treaties of the Free City of Danzig